Lucian Dorin Răduţă (born 16 August 1988) is a Romanian former professional football player who made his debut for the Rapid București first team in the 2006–07 season, playing only one league game that season.

References

External links
 
 
 

1988 births
Living people
Romanian footballers
Liga I players
Liga II players
FC Rapid București players
ASA 2013 Târgu Mureș players
CS Mioveni players
Association football forwards